XTC: This Is Pop is a 2017 documentary film directed by Charlie Thomas and Roger Penny about the English rock band XTC. It is focused on the group's musical evolution over the three decades they were active and includes new interviews with XTC guitarist Andy Partridge, bassist Colin Moulding, second guitarist Dave Gregory and drummer Terry Chambers. Archival footage, animations, and specially shot sequences are also featured. The title is derived from the 1978 XTC song "This Is Pop", which Partridge wrote as an attempt to define the band's aesthetic before rock critics could.

Reception
Partridge wanted XTC: This Is Pop to be a biopic with four young Japanese women playing the band, but his ideas were rejected due to budget concerns. At the beginning of the film, he expresses his dislikes of "rockumentaries" and states: "The only thing that's worthy of making a documentary about XTC is it's not about the rock n roll bollocks that constitute 99% of other bands." He was ultimately pleased with the final product, calling it "a gold medal for documentary, and a silver medal for editing," but questioned Moulding's "psychosomatic" characterisation of his 1982 Valium withdrawal period.

Moulding said after the film's premiere on Sky Arts: "I think it was pretty good. I mean, Andy was the central character which I felt was better for the story. The river has other tributaries as well, but I felt it was quite well done. Yeah, I quite liked it." According to Partridge, Gregory was "impressed".

Reviewing the film for Decider, Benjamin Smith described it as an "excellent" documentary in which the members comment little "on their misfortunes, of which there were significantly more than what's covered in the film." Radio Times critic Mark Braxton called it a "vibrant documentary ... exactly the tribute they deserve, filmed against an aptly surreal backdrop mixing model trains with miniature faking."

Cast

XTC
 Andy Partridge
 Colin Moulding
 Terry Chambers
 Dave Gregory

Original band associates
 John Leckie – producer or co-producer on White Music, Go 2, 25 O'Clock and Psonic Psunspot
 Dave Mattacks – drummer on Nonsuch
 Hugh Padgham – engineer on Drums & Wires and Black Sea,  co-producer on English Settlement
 Stewart Copeland – toured with the group as a member of the Police in the early 1980s

Other guests

 Steven Wilson (Porcupine Tree)
 Clem Burke (Blondie)
 James Hayward
 Miles Kane (Last Shadow Puppets)
 John Grant (The Czars)
 Laurie Langan
 Sarah Palmer (Fassine)
 Harry Shearer (Spinal Tap)

See also
 Great Aspirations – Moulding and Chambers reunion EP that coincided with the film's premiere

References

External links
 

2017 films
2010s English-language films
2017 documentary films
English music history
English films
XTC
Documentary films about rock music and musicians
British documentary films
2010s British films